Cory D. Mason IV (born January 25, 1973) is a Democratic Party politician and the mayor of Racine, Wisconsin. From 2007 to 2018, Mason served as a member of the Wisconsin State Assembly representing the city of Racine and eastern Racine County.

Early life and education
Mason was born in Racine and graduated from Case High School. He then received a bachelor of arts degree in philosophy from the University of Wisconsin–Madison.

Wisconsin State Assembly
While in the assembly, Mason served as the ranking Assembly Democratic member of the Assembly Committee on Environment and Forestry, the Joint Legislative Council, and Joint Survey Committee on Retirement Systems. He also served on the Assembly Committee on Tourism.

Mason was named the 2009-2010 Legislator of the Year by the Wisconsin Technical College District Boards Association for his support of Wisconsin's technical colleges. Other awards include the 2014 Children's Champion Policy Award from Children's Hospital of Wisconsin, the 2013 Friend of the UW Award by the United Council of UW Students, and the River Champion Award by the River Alliance of Wisconsin. Mason was named 2012 Legislator of the Year by the Professional Fire Fighters of Wisconsin and was named to the Conservation Honor Roll for 2011-2012 by the Wisconsin League of Conservation Voters. He was also given an Award of Merit by the Wisconsin Association for Career and Technical Education.

Mayoral candidacy
Mason ran for mayor of Racine in 2017 for a special election to complete the term of the previous mayor, John Dickert. Mason won with the largest share of votes in both the primary and general elections.

Mayoralty
Mason's mayoral administration has thus far resulted in increased residential and commercial development such as the Gold Medal Loft project in Uptown Racine and the construction of apartments at the former Walker Manufacturing site along the shores of Lake Michigan in Downtown Racine. Mason has also overseen downtown investment from global technology company Foxconn.

He was re-elected in 2019.

Electoral history

Wisconsin Assembly 62nd District (2006, 2008, 2010)

Wisconsin Assembly 66th District (2012, 2014, 2016)

Racine Mayor (2017, 2019, 2023)

References

External links
City of Racine - Mayor Cory Mason - official government website
Cory Mason for Mayor - official campaign website
 
 Follow the Money - Cory Mason
2008 2006 campaign contributions
Campaign 2008 campaign contributions at Wisconsin Democracy Campaign

1973 births
Living people
University of Wisconsin–Madison College of Letters and Science alumni
Mayors of Racine, Wisconsin
Democratic Party members of the Wisconsin State Assembly
21st-century American politicians